Shawn Bentler is a convicted mass murderer from Bonaparte, Iowa. On October 14th 2006, 22 year old Bentler murdered his father Michael, 53, his mother Sandra, 47, and his three younger sisters; Sheena, 17, Shelby, 15, and Shayne, 14.
It was claimed that the motive was so he could inherit his family's fortune. He was consequently sentenced to four concurrent life sentences and a consecutive life sentence.

References

American mass murderers
American prisoners sentenced to life imprisonment
Prisoners sentenced to life imprisonment by Iowa
American people convicted of murder
People convicted of murder by Iowa
1984 births
Living people
People from Van Buren County, Iowa
2006 murders in the United States
Familicides